NGC 5490 is a radio galaxy in the constellation Boötes.

Gra 1408+17 

Gra 1408+17 is a radio-source in NGC 5490, located at the coordinates: RA , Dec. ; Galactic coordinates J2000 : 009.27 ± 180000, +69.41 ± 180000.

References

External links
 
Distance 
Image NGC 5490

Boötes
5490
09058
50558
Radio galaxies
Elliptical galaxies